Nico Richter (2 December 1915, in Amsterdam – 16 August 1945, in Amsterdam) was a Dutch composer. He was Jewish.

References

1915 births
1945 deaths
Dutch male classical composers
Dutch classical composers
Modernist composers
Musicians from Amsterdam
Auschwitz concentration camp prisoners
Dutch Jews who died in the Holocaust
20th-century Dutch male musicians
Dutch people who died in Dachau concentration camp
Dutch civilians killed in World War II